Carnival Confession is a 1960 West German crime film directed by William Dieterle and starring Hans Söhnker, Gitty Djamal and Götz George.

It was made by the revived UFA company and was the veteran director Dieterle's penultimate cinema film and his last in his native Germany.

Cast
 Hans Söhnker as Panezza
 Gitty Djamal as Viola
 Götz George as Clemens
 Friedrich Domin as Canon Henrici
 Christian Wolff as Jeanmarie
 Berta Drews as Frau Bäumler
 Hilde Hildebrand as Mme. Guttier
 Grit Boettcher as Bertel
 Ursula Heyer as Rosa
 Helga Schlack as Bettine
 Helga Tölle as Katharina
 Rainer Brandt as Ferdinand Bäumler
 Herbert Tiede as Merzbecher
 Wolfgang Völz
 Milena von Eckhardt as Frau Panezza
 Albert Bessler as Dr. Classen
 Harry Engel

References

Bibliography 
 Bock, Hans-Michael & Bergfelder, Tim. The Concise Cinegraph: Encyclopaedia of German Cinema. Berghahn Books, 2009.

External links 
 

1960 films
West German films
German historical films
1960s historical films
German crime films
1960 crime films
1960s German-language films
Films directed by William Dieterle
Films set in 1913
Films based on works by Carl Zuckmayer
UFA GmbH films
1960s German films